Eudonia sabulosella is a species of moth in the family Crambidae. This species is endemic to New Zealand and is regarded as being common. The larvae of this species are known to damage pasture in New Zealand.

Taxonomy 
This species was originally described by Francis Walker in 1863 using a female specimen collected by Dr. A. Sinclair in Auckland and named Crambus sabulosellus. In 1884 Edward Meyrick discussed the species giving a more detailed description, placing it within the genus Scoparia and changed the ending of the species name from the masculine -us to the feminine -a. George Hudson discussed and illustrated this species in his 1928 publication The Butterflies and Moths of New Zealand also under the name Scoparia sabulosella. In 1988 John S. Dugdale placed the species in the genus Eudonia.

Description 

Walker described the species as follows:

This species is variable with some specimens being much darker than others. However, despite this E. sabulosella can be distinguished from similar species as it always has a pale ochreous ground colour to the forewings along with two distinct blackish dots.

Distribution 
This species is endemic to New Zealand. It is generally distributed throughout New Zealand and can also be found on the Chatham Islands, Stewart Island as well as in the Auckland Islands.

Food resources

Caterpillar hosts 
The larvae of this species feed on lichens, bryophytes and grasses.

Adult diet 
The adult moths have been recorded as visiting and likely feeding from the flowers of Corokia cotoneaster, Dracophyllum acerosum, Helichrysum intermedium, Lobelia angulata, Olearia virgata, Pimelea sericeovillosa.

Adult pollination 
The adult moths pollinate Olearia virgata, Helichrysum selago, Praria angulata, Corokia cotoneaster, Dracophyllum acerosum and Pimelea sericeo-villosa.

Occurrence 
Adults of E. sabulosella are normally present during December and January.

Human interactions 
This species is regarded as being an economically damaging pest. The larvae of E. sabulosella can cause considerable damage to pasture.

References

Moths described in 1863
Eudonia
Moths of New Zealand
Endemic fauna of New Zealand
Taxa named by Francis Walker (entomologist)
Endemic moths of New Zealand